Frank Løke (born 6 February 1980) is a Norwegian team handball player. He was voted into the All Star Team (as Pivot) at the 2008 European Men's Handball Championship. Løke plays for the Norwegian team Runar Sandefjord.

In August 2018 he participated in a charity boxing match against professional boxer Hadi Srour.

Family
His younger  sister Heidi Løke is also a team handball player, playing on the Norwegian national team.

References

1980 births
Expatriate handball players
Living people
Norwegian expatriate sportspeople in Switzerland
Norwegian male handball players
RK Zagreb players
Norwegian expatriate sportspeople in Croatia
Norwegian expatriate sportspeople in Denmark
Norwegian expatriate sportspeople in Germany